Impact Guru is a donation based crowdfunding platform that offers global crowdfunding solutions for NGOs, social enterprises, startups and individuals. It was launched by Maneka Gandhi, Union Cabinet Minister for Women & Child Development, Government of India in September 2015.

Impact Guru has mobilized for various NGOs and social enterprises in more than 15 countries.

History 
Impact Guru was incubated at Harvard Innovation Lab’s Venture Initiation Program in 2014 and PACT at Impact Hub in Singapore in the year 2015. Impact Guru was founded by Piyush Jain, a graduate of the Wharton Business School and Khushboo Jain, an alumnus of Welingkar Institute of Management.

Funding 
In April 2015, Impact Guru raised   seed round from a Singapore-based venture capital firm RB Investments, and Fundnel, a private investment platform based in Southeast Asia.  
Since its inception, Impact Guru has raised  to support various causes and organizations.

Partnerships 
In April 2016, Impact Guru partnered with Singapore's investment platform Fundnel to tap into philanthropic and investment capital from the Indian diaspora based in Southeast Asia.
In September 2016, Impact Guru partnered with United Nations entity named UN Women to run the Project Inspire, an initiative by Singapore Committee for UN Women in partnership with Bain & Company and MasterCard to support social entrepreneurs working towards Women's empowerment.
In October 2016, It partnered with US and UK based crowdfunding platform, GlobalGiving.

Media
Impact Guru was featured in CNBC TV18's longest running show -Young Turks.

See also 
 Comparison of crowdfunding services
 GlobalGiving

References

External links 

Crowdfunding platforms of India
Indian companies established in 2014
Internet properties established in 2014
2014 establishments in India